Michele Clarke (née Keinzley) (born 6 September 1982) is an association football player who represented New Zealand at international level.

Clarke came on as a substitute to score a brace on her debut as the Football Ferns thrashed Samoa 15–0 in a World Cup qualifier on 7 April 2003. She finished her international career with 13 caps and two goals to her credit.

References

External links

1982 births
Living people
New Zealand women's international footballers
New Zealand women's association footballers

Women's association footballers not categorized by position